The WXXI Public Broadcasting Council is a community non-profit organization of some 36,000 subscribing members in the Rochester, New York metropolitan area, and owns that city's major public television and Community radio stations, a newspaper, and other broadcasting services.

The Public Broadcasting Council also partners with the City of Rochester to operate and program named City12, a Government-access television (GATV) cable channel which airs Public-access television programming and live City Council meetings on a 15-hour daily schedule.

History 
It was first formed in 1958 by local educators and community leaders as the Rochester Area Educational Television Association to produce and provide Educational television programming to be seen on the city's commercial broadcasting television stations. During the early 1960s the organization raised funds to build its own independent signal which would furnish daily educational, cultural, and informational programming during both school hours and prime-time evening hours for an all-ages family audience. WXXI-TV signed on in September 1966, from studios in the former East High School building in Rochester. Those facilities eventually proved unable to accommodate the station's growth in audience and local programming, and could not provide room for a planned FM non-commercial Community radio sister station, so WXXI built a new Public Broadcasting Center and opened it in December 1974. It was at that time, that companion station WXXI-FM was opened and became the Rochester community's first full-market-coverage Non-commercial educational and cultural radio station. Demand for full-time Non-commercial radio service in both classical/fine arts and news/talk formats grew beyond the ability of one signal to serve. So in 1984, Rochester AM station WSAY was acquired and became WXXI (AM), a regional service with a signal capable of reaching the six-county Rochester metropolitan region. It opened its news/talk service with local and NPR programming on July 2 of that year. WXXI-FM then became a 24-hour classical and fine arts station. Each station has since built a substantial and growing audience.
The WXXI-FM facility now includes not only analog FM service and the Reachout Radio subcarrier service for the blind and visually impaired, but full-market digital coverage on both HD-1 and HD-2 channels, the latter of which simulcasts WXXI-AM in digital stereo. Later on, WXXI joined in partnership with the University of Rochester to operate WRUR-FM as a service with both news and adult alternative music and specialty programming, and took control of WXXY (FM) in Houghton, New York, in the Southern Tier region to provide a mix of classical and news programming for a portion of the state which had previously been outside the range of a public signal.  WXXI joined in partnership with Hobart and William Smith Colleges (operators of National Public Radio (NPR) affiliate WEOS (FM) in Geneva, New York) to provide an alternative non-commercial service for the southern Finger Lakes region: WITH (FM) in Ithaca opened during the spring of 2010.

WXXI-TV, meanwhile, continued to grow.  The Public Broadcasting Center more than doubled in size in 1991, adding additional radio studios and three fully equipped TV production studios. It built a new digital full-service television transmitter capable of simultaneously transmitting four programming streams—the main WXXI-TV public signal in high definition, plus the Public Broadcasting Service PBS World programming schedule and the Create schedule emphasizing and the arts instructional and how-to programming and the PBS Kids schedule children's programming, all of which air 24 hours daily, plus a special training channel serving regional public safety agencies with professional Instructional television  programming.

In 2012, WXXI announced a long term affiliation with the Little Theatre where WXXI took over operations of the venue. In December 2018, it was announced that WXXI via a for-profit arm was acquiring the main Rochester alternative weekly newspaper City Newspaper from its founders who were going into retirement.

On October 7, 2022, WXXI announced it would purchase WJZR from Lee Rust. The $1.2 million deal is structured as a $675,000 payment as well as an additional $525,000 donation by Rust to WXXI; the acquisition was completed on January 24, 2023. WXXI intends to return the station to service in 2023 on a noncommercial basis as the first FM frequency for its news/talk programming, currently heard only on WXXI (1370 AM), with a new call sign likely to be selected at that time.

Operations

Television
WXXI-TV (channel 21) - Rochester's PBS member station, along with subchannels for Create and World and PBS Kids

Radio
WXXI (AM) (1370) - news/talk with NPR, PRI, APM spoken word content along with local news
WJZR (105.9) — a planned FM simulcast of WXXI (AM)
WXXI-FM (91.5) - all-classical music with hourly NPR News updates
WXXY (90.3) - a Houghton-based simulcast of WXXI-FM for southern part of Rochester market
Reachout Radio, the area's radio reading service provider
WRUR-FM, a partnership with the University of Rochester providing NPR News and eclectic music
WEOS (FM), a partnership with Hobart and William Smith Colleges
WITH (FM), a partnership with Hobart and William Smith Colleges

Print
City Newspaper - an alternative weekly newspaper (via a for-profit arm)

Other
Little Theatre - operated by WXXI

References

External links
About WXXI Services — official web page about overall operations
John S. Porter papers, at the University of Maryland libraries. Porter was a producer of instructional television 1958-1969, during the early years of the Council.

Organizations established in 1958
PBS member networks
NPR member networks
Mass media in Rochester, New York
Organizations based in Rochester, New York
1958 establishments in New York (state)